Red is Nanase Aikawa's first album. It includes her first four singles. The album reached #1 on Oricon charts and sold over two million copies, as certified by the RIAJ.

Track listing

References

1996 debut albums
Avex Group albums
Nanase Aikawa albums